Pierre Relecom (born 12 July 1985) is a Belgian professional golfer.

Relecom has played on the Challenge Tour since 2008. He won his first title in July 2014 at the Swiss Challenge.

Professional wins (1)

Challenge Tour wins (1)

Team appearances
Amateur
Eisenhower Trophy (representing Belgium): 2004, 2006
Jacques Léglise Trophy (representing Continental Europe): 2003

References

External links

Belgian male golfers
European Tour golfers
Sportspeople from Brussels
Sportspeople from Walloon Brabant
1985 births
Living people
21st-century Belgian people